The Pit and the Pendulum (released on DVD in the United States as The Inquisitor) is a 1991 American horror film directed by Stuart Gordon and based on the 1842 short story by Edgar Allan Poe. The film is an amalgamation of the aforementioned story with Poe's "The Cask of Amontillado", and it also appropriates the anecdote of "The Sword of Damocles", reassigning it to the character of Torquemada.

Plot summary 
In 1492 Spain, Grand Inquisitor Torquemada leads a bloody reign of terror. Opposed to the use of torture by the Church, Maria speaks out during the public execution of a disenfranchised noble family. Torquemada is tempted by Maria's beauty, and atones through self-torture. Confused by these new desires, he accuses Maria of witchcraft and orders that she be tortured until she confesses. During Maria's interrogation, Torquemada cannot stop himself from staring at her naked body; he orders that she be imprisoned. Maria is befriended by fellow prisoner Esmerelda, a confessed witch. Together they struggle to save themselves from the sinister Torquemada. Maria's husband Antonio breaks into the castle to rescue his innocent wife. He fails and is imprisoned for his actions. Torquemada decides to test a new torture device, the Pit and the Pendulum, on Antonio.

Cast
 Lance Henriksen as Torquemada
 Rona De Ricci as Maria
 Jonathan Fuller as Antonio
 Frances Bay as Esmeralda
 Mark Margolis as Mendoza
 Jeffrey Combs as Francisco
 Stephen Lee as Gomez
 Tom Towles as Don Carlos
 William J. Norris as Dr. Huesos
 Carolyn Purdy-Gordon as Contessa D'Alba Molina
 Oliver Reed as Cardinal
 Benito Stefanelli as Executioner
 Geoffrey Copleston as Butcher

Release 
The film was given quick runs at many film festivals until its home video release in the summer of 1991. In 2000, Full Moon Features released a DVD of the film, which has now been discontinued for copyright reasons. Since then it has been released on DVD as part of the "Stuart Gordon Boxset", which also includes Castle Freak, Deathbed, and a bonus disc. The film was re-released on DVD on 2 August 2011 by Echo Bridge Home Entertainment. The film was released on Blu-ray on April 30, 2013 by Full Moon and on August 12, 2013 by 88 Films in the U.K.

Critical reception 
The Pit and the Pendulum has received a mixed reception from critics, and currently holds a 56% 'rotten' rating on movie review aggregator website Rotten Tomatoes based on nine reviews.

See also 
 The Pit and the Pendulum – 1961 film starring Vincent Price and directed by Roger Corman, released 30 years earlier

References

External links 
 

American horror films
1991 films
Films based on The Pit and the Pendulum
1991 horror films
Films about witchcraft
Films directed by Stuart Gordon
Films scored by Richard Band
Inquisition in fiction
Films set in the 1490s
Cultural depictions of Tomás de Torquemada
Films based on multiple works
1990s English-language films
1990s American films